Histiogamphelus briggsii, also known as Brigg's pipefish, is a species of marine fish in the family Sygnathidae. They are an ovoviviparous species, in which males brood eggs and give birth to live young.

References

External links
Fishes of Australia - Histiogamphelus briggsii
Fishbase - Histiogamphelus briggsii

Syngnathidae
Fish described in 1914